Hassan Farhan al-Maliki is a Saudi Arabian Islamic scholar who has been put on trial by the Saudi establishment for what they claim are his heterodox views on Islam. Al-Maliki's views have been described as Quranist, moderate, tolerant, and one of opposition to the takfiri ideology.

Career and arrest
Hassan al-Maliki, prior to his arrest, was a writer, researcher and Islamic historian. He had been arrested on numerous occasions and released, although this escalated by 2019 when Saudi prosecutors purportedly sought the death penalty against him. Saudi analysts had previously condemned him for his liberal and pro-reformation stance, particularly with regard to Wahhabism, sympathy for Houthis, criticism of several seventh century figures, and violating cybercrime law. The department which arrested him, the Specialised Criminal Court, was purportedly established to counter terrorism within the country.

Hassan was placed into detention in September 2017; however, charges were laid against him a year later in October 2018. Human Rights Watch criticized the arrest as being predicated on grounds that had "no resemblance to recognized crimes." Michael Page, a HRW director commenting on the case said "Mohammed bin Salman has consistently pledged to support a more ‘moderate’ version of Islam while his country maintains a prosecution service that seeks the death penalty against religious reformers for expressing their peaceful ideas". In all, the court accused him of 14 different charges.

During a message he delivered from prison, Maliki said that he was arrested by Wahhabists, and religious extremists with power, and he exonerated the Saudi government from involvement in his arrest. Reports on the religious affiliation of Hassan vary, with some describing him as a Maliki Sunni, whilst others describe him as a Quranist, i.e. an adherent of the ahl- al-Qur'an school of thought. Maliki, described as a Quran-centric scholar, has also stated that cognizant matters and those related to obedience are according to the Quranic-oriented stance, matters postponed for the hereafter, stating that the ahl al Quran stance dictates that divine wordly penal codes are limited to murder, corruption and aggression. He has also stated that 90% of highly circulated hadiths by ulama are inauthentic, and used the phrase followers of sahaba to describe Sunnism, followers of ahl al-bayt to describe Shi'ism and used the term "shi'at al-Qur'an" to describe adherents to Quran-centric faith.

References

Living people
Saudi Arabian Muslims
Saudi Arabian prisoners and detainees
1970 births
Saudi Arabian Quranist Muslims